1981–82 in English field hockey . The principal event for men was the National Inter League Championship which brought together the winners of their respective regional leagues. The Men's championship was won by Slough

The Men's Cup was won by Southgate and the Women's Cup was won by Slough.

Men's Truman National Inter League Championship 
(Held at Eastcote, April 24–25)

Group A

Group B

Final 

Slough
Ian Taylor, Paul Barber, Steve Partington, Manjit Flora (Badar Butt sub), Brajinder Daved, John Allen (A Radnedge sub), Ken Partington, Sutinder Singh Khehar, Balwant Saini, Ravinder Laly, Kuki Dhak
Cambridge City
I Haugh, J Maxey, N Muncey, R Pearson, R Whitworth, S Graves, M Saggers, P Spiers, N Verma, P White, J Wilkenson (T Greaves sub)

Men's Cup (Rank Xerox National Clubs Championship)

Quarter-finals

Semi-finals

Final 
(Mar 28, Walker Memorial Ground, Southgate)

Southgate
David Owen, James Duthie, Mike Spray, David Craig, Ian McGinn, M Driver, Richard Dodds, Sean Kerly, Steve Batchelor, David Thomas, Andrew Western 
Slough
Ian Taylor, Paul Barber, Mike Parris (Harjinder Singh Dhami sub), Manjit Flora, Brajinder Daved, John Allen, Bhaji Flora, Sutinder Singh Khehar, Balwant Saini, Ravinder Laly, Kuki Dhak

Women's Cup (National Clubs Championship) 
(Durham, April 17–18)

Group A

Group B

Semi-finals 

 *Slough won on penalty strokes

Final

References 

1981
field hockey
field hockey
1981 in field hockey
1982 in field hockey